This list includes State Prizes of Ukraine:

Shevchenko National Prize
State Prize of Ukraine in the Field of Architecture
State Prize of Ukraine in the field of education
Myroslav Skoryk State Prize of Ukraine
Oleksandr Dovzhenko State Prize
State Prizes of the URSR
State Prize of Ukraine in Science and Technology
National Prize of Ukraine named after Borys Paton 
Prize of the Cabinet of Ministers of Ukraine for special achievements of youth in the development of Ukraine
Prize of the Cabinet of Ministers of Ukraine for the development and implementation of innovative technologies
Prize of the Verkhovna Rada of Ukraine to the most talented young scientists in the field of basic and applied research, and scientific and technological research works

References 

Ukraine-related lists